Roberto Pérez de Alva Blanco (born 2 April 1953) is a Mexican politician affiliated with the Institutional Revolutionary Party. He served as Senator of the LVIII and LIX Legislatures of the Mexican Congress representing Baja California and as Deputy of the LVII Legislature. He also served as a local deputy in the XV Legislature of the Congress of Baja California.

References

1953 births
Living people
Politicians from Mexico City
Members of the Senate of the Republic (Mexico)
Members of the Chamber of Deputies (Mexico)
Institutional Revolutionary Party politicians
20th-century Mexican politicians
21st-century Mexican politicians
Members of the Congress of Baja California